Qasemabad (also Romanized as Qāsemābād; also known as Ghasem Abad and Qāsimābād) is a village in Posht Rud Rural District, in the Central District of Narmashir County, Kerman Province, Iran. At the 2006 census, its population was 1,268, in 324 families.

References 

Populated places in Narmashir County